Ooma Kuyil is a 1983 Indian Malayalam-language film directed by Balu Mahendra and produced by Joseph Abraham. The film stars Y. Gee. Mahendra, Aruna and Poornima Jayaram. The film has a musical score by Ilaiyaraaja. The film is a remake of the director's own debut film Kokila, made in Kannada.

Premise
Oomakkuyil is the story a bank executive and his affair with the daughter of his house owner. As their relationship goes smoothly a dark day happens in the life of the bank executive and his house maid, which turns everyone's dream upside down.

Cast
Y. G. Mahendran
Poornima Jayaram
Aruna
Adoor Bhasi
Jagathy Sreekumar

Production 
After Kamal Haasan refused to reprise his role from Kokila, he was replaced with Y. G. Mahendran.

Soundtrack
The music was composed by Ilaiyaraaja with lyrics by Madhu Alappuzha and O. N. V. Kurup.

References

External links
 

1983 films
1980s Malayalam-language films
Films directed by Balu Mahendra
Films scored by Ilaiyaraaja
Malayalam remakes of Kannada films